Parafreutreta mavoana is a species of tephritid or fruit flies in the genus Parafreutreta of the family Tephritidae.

Distribution
Madagascar.

References

Tephritinae
Insects described in 1952
Diptera of Africa